Rosthwaite Fell is a fell in the English Lake District.

Rosthwaite Fell also has loose connections to the Scafell group of fells. The fells name derives from the Old Norse language and means “The peak above the clearing with a heap of stones” with “hreysi” meaning a heap of stones and “thveit” meaning a clearing.

Topography
Rosthwaite Fell reaches a height of 612 m (2,008 ft) at its highest point, which is commonly known as Rosthwaite Cam. It also has a subsidiary top, Bessyboot (550 m, 1,804 ft ), which lies 800 metres north of the main summit. Alfred Wainwright took Bessyboot as the summit of the fell for his Pictorial Guide to the Lakeland Fells. Dovenest Crag, which lies 500 metres south west of the summit, is generally considered to be a part of Glaramara and is covered in that article.

The fell's boundaries are clearly defined to the north, west and east by valleys and streams. The western side falls to Borrowdale and the infant River Derwent, the eastern flank descends to the Langstrath valley and its beck while the northern slopes go down to the Stonethwaite valley. To the south, Rosthwaite Fell is linked to the higher and better known fell of Glaramara by a marshy and undulating ridge which goes over several subsidiary tops on the way.

Rosthwaite Fell is craggy and steep on the three sides that descend to valleys and there is no simple and appealing route of ascent. This, combined with the fact that there are many more attractive climbs in the area, makes the fell a quiet and unfrequented place.

Geology
Because of its unique geology, Rosthwaite Fell was declared a Site of Special Scientific Interest in 1985 over an area of 230 hectares. With the English Nature web site saying:

"The extensive crags and rock outcrops within this site provide outstanding exposures of a thick succession of volcanic rock-layers representing a large proportion of the important episode of volcanic activity which generated the Borrowdale Volcanic Group during the middle Ordovician Period of geological history, about 460 million years ago. A wide variety of different rocktypes are present and well exposed within the site. This is an important site as a reference section for detailed geological study and is of historical interest as an area where certain volcanic rock-types were first recognised."

Ascents
Rosthwaite Fell can be climbed from Stonethwaite or from the Borrowdale road between Seatoller and Rosthwaite. The latter route goes up Combe Gill for a kilometre before striking steeply up the gill's eastern flank to gain the top of the fell. The Stonethwaite route uses Stanger Gill as a guide up to a height of almost 500 metres from where it is a simple walk to the summit of Bessyboot. A mild scramble also allows the north ridge to be ascended starting behind Chapel Farm and keeping west of the locally named Papelay Crag.

Summits
The fell's two main summits, Rosthwaite Cam and Bessyboot, are divided by a depression with a height of around 500 metres which contains the charmingly named Tarn at Leaves, a small mountain lake with a length of approximately 100 metres. The summit rocks of Rosthwaite Cam require some mild scrambling to reach the highest point.

References 
 A Pictorial Guide to the Lakeland Fells, The Southern Fells, Alfred Wainwright, 
 The Mountains of England and Wales, Volume 2, John and Anne Nuttall, 
 Complete Lakeland Fells, Bill Birkett, 
 English Nature on SSSI

Fells of the Lake District
Sites of Special Scientific Interest notified in 1985
Sites of Special Scientific Interest in Cumbria
Allerdale